When Bush Comes to Shove is a 2002 album by the Capitol Steps.

Track listing
Shoe-Bomb
Don't Go Faking You're Smart
Enron-Ron-Ron
Tom Ridge Bedtime Story #1
Taliban
Pack the Knife
Mr. Greenspan
Dr. Tommy Tuck
Everybody Must Get Cloned
Tony With the Light Brown Hair
Who'll Drop a Bomb During Ram-A-Dan-A-Dan?
Jacques Chirac
Osama Come Out Tomorrow
Old Man Wizard
Con-Did-It
Tom Ridge Bedtime Story #2
You Don't Mess Around With Jim
Cher the Power
India Oh India
Argentina
Moooooooo
Tom Ridge Bedtime Story #3
Glory, Paranoia
Lirty Dies: Schmenron and Obama Sin Laden

References

Capitol Steps albums
2002 live albums
Self-released albums
2000s comedy albums
Songs about George W. Bush